Olenecamptus hofmanni is a species of beetle in the family Cerambycidae. It was described by Quedenfeldt in 1882. It is known from Ghana, Cameroon, the Democratic Republic of the Congo, the Republic of the Congo, Tanzania, the Central African Republic, Gabon, Angola, Malawi, the Ivory Coast, South Africa, and Zimbabwe. It contains the varietas Olenecamptus hofmanni var. dimbokro.

References

Dorcaschematini
Beetles described in 1882